ELKO Group (ELKO Grupa AS) is an international and Latvian-based distributor of IT and consumer electronics products in Europe and Central Asia. The company acts as a consultant to partners and a wholesaler of computer and electronic products. ELKO operates in 31 countries, with sales offices in 11 countries - Latvia, Estonia, Lithuania, Russia, Ukraine, Romania, Slovenia, Slovakia, Czech Republic, Sweden, and Poland. The headquarters of ELKO is located in Riga, Latvia.

ELKO was the largest group in Latvia in 2018.

ELKO is a member of the Global Technology Distribution Council (GTDC), the Exporters Association "The Red Jackets" in Latvia, the Latvian Logistics Association, the Latvian Chamber of Commerce and Industry,

History
In 1993, four young entrepreneurs from Latvia founded a business with the intention to provide local retailers with new and upcoming IT products.

The next year ELKO expanded in Baltics and opens subsidiary companies in Lithuania (ELKO Kaunas) and in Estonia (ELKO Eesti). In further years ELKO continues its expansion by entering Russian market (office in Moscow), Ukrainian market (office in Kiev), opening subsidiary companies in Romania (Bucharest) – ELKOTech Romania, and Slovenia (Ljubljana) – ELKOTex Slovenia. Further expansion takes place also in Russia, with the foundation of a new subsidiary in St. Petersburg. In 2000 the new subsidiary company was open in Slovakia (Bratislava) and ELKO Latvia Ltd. is founded in Latvia.

In order to reorganize the Group's structure and improve corporate governance, ELKO creates holding company ELKO Grupa AS (ELKO Group).

In 2005 ELKO Group becomes the largest company in Latvia (by turnover). In 2007 ELKO Group becomes the first Latvian company to reach US$1 billion turnover.

In 2017, ELKO entered the Nordic-region market by acquiring Gandalf, a distributor of computers and peripheral products in Sweden. In 2018, ELKO acquired Absolut Trading Company, a Russian distributor of household appliances and electronics. In 2019 the ELKO Group company WESTech, a distributor of IT products in Slovakia, completed the acquisition of ARAŠID.

Listed among finalists for Distributor of the Year in European IT and Software Excellence Awards 2020. In 2020 ELKO Group's turnover exceeds US$2 billion

References

External links
ELKO Group Website
Electronic Components

Companies of Latvia
Companies based in Riga
Companies established in 1993
Electronic component distributors
1993 establishments in Latvia
Latvian brands